Anasimyia lineata is a Palaearctic species of hoverfly.

Description
External images
The face protrudes forwards as a long snout which tapers to a point. The body has dark ground colour. The male has triangular orange markings on the tergites (especially on tergite 2). Female markings are orange or grey. The stigma is in the form of a dark patch between the veins.

Keys and accounts 
Coe R.L. (1953) Syrphidae
Van Veen, M. (2004) Hoverflies of Northwest Europe 
Van der Goot, V.S. (1981) De zweefvliegen van Noordwest - Europa en Europees Rusland, in het bijzonder van de Benelux
Bei-Bienko, G.Y. & Steyskal, G.C. (1988) Keys to USSR insects. Diptera

Habits
Wetlands including bog, fen and marsh, pond-side and riverine fen and alluvial wetlands, such as oxbow lakes. Flowers visited include Alisma plantago-aquatica, Caltha, Cardamine pratense, Cicuta viros, Lythrum salicaria, Menyanthes trifoliata, Nymphaea alba, Potentilla anserina, Ranunculus, Lychnis flos-cuculi, Sorbus aucuparia, Crataegus and Anthriscus sylvestris.
The larva is aquatic and microphagous in rotting plant debris. It is illustrated by Rotheray (1993)

Distribution

Entire temperate Palearctic.

References

External links
 Biolib

Muscomorph flies of Europe
Eristalinae
Insects described in 1787
Taxa named by Johan Christian Fabricius